Mastogloiales is an order of algae belonging to the class Bacillariophyceae.

Families:
 Mastogloiaceae

References

Algae